Robert D. Clifton (born December 31, 1968) is an American Republican Party politician who has represented the 12th Legislative District in the New Jersey General Assembly since January 10, 2012. He previously served on the Monmouth County, New Jersey Board of Chosen Freeholders from 2005 until he took office in the Assembly.

Early life 
Clifton was born and raised in Matawan, where he attended local elementary schools and St. John Vianney High School. He earned a bachelor's degree in political science at Rider College (now Rider University) and a master's degree in political science at the University of Richmond. He has been employed by Comcast Cable as Director of Government and Community Affairs since 2001. Prior to that, Clifton was Director of Industry Relations for the New Jersey Pavement and Asphalt Association, where he acted as liaison between the trade association and municipalities throughout the state regarding road improvement issues. He also served as an assistant to the Deputy Commissioner of the New Jersey Department of Labor and a legislative aide to former Assemblyman Michael Arnone.

Monmouth County Politics 
Clifton was the Mayor of Matawan from 1996 until 2005. He was appointed mayor in October 1996 upon the resignation of Robert Shuey. In addition, he served on the borough's unified Planning Board and Zoning Board of Adjustment, the Board of Health, and the Monmouth County Board of Drug & Alcohol Abuse Services. He also served as chairman of the Bayshore Conference of Mayors. In order to focus on his position as a newly elected Freeholder, he resigned from his mayoral post on January 18, 2005. As Freeholder, Clifton oversaw Finance and Information Technology which includes Department of Finance, the Monmouth County Improvement Authority, Information Technology Services, Department of Purchasing, Records Management and the County Treasurer. Clifton served three terms on the Board of Chosen Freeholders, elected in 2004, 2007, and 2010. In 2008, he served as Deputy Director of the Board; Clifton was succeeded in that post by John D'Amico, Jr. in 2009. At the January 7, 2010 annual reorganization, he was again chosen as Deputy Director and at the January 6, 2011 annual reorganization, he was chosen as Director of the Monmouth County, New Jersey Board of Chosen Freeholders.

New Jersey Assembly 
In 2011, after legislative redistricting, Clifton ran for the Assembly seat in the 12th District that was opened when Samuel D. Thompson ran for New Jersey Senate. He and his running mate Ronald S. Dancer defeated the Democratic candidates, William Spedding and Catherine Tinney Rome, in the general election. He was sworn in on January 10, 2012.

Committees 
Budget
Housing and Community Development
Transportation and Independent Authorities

District 12 
Each of the 40 districts in the New Jersey Legislature has one representative in the New Jersey Senate and two members in the New Jersey General Assembly. The representatives from the 12th District for the 2022—23 Legislative Session are:
 Senator Samuel D. Thompson (R)
 Assemblyman Robert D. Clifton (R)
 Assemblyman Alex Sauickie (R)

Personal life 
Clifton lives in Matawan with his wife Tracy and his two sons.

Electoral history

Assembly

See also
List of Monmouth County Board of County Commissioner Directors

References

External links
Assemblyman Clifton's legislative web page, New Jersey Legislature
New Jersey Legislature financial disclosure forms - 2016 2015 2014 2013 2012 2011

1968 births
Living people
Mayors of places in New Jersey
County commissioners in New Jersey
Republican Party members of the New Jersey General Assembly
People from Matawan, New Jersey
Politicians from Monmouth County, New Jersey
Rider University alumni
St. John Vianney High School (New Jersey) alumni
University of Richmond alumni
21st-century American politicians